was the fifteenth of the sixty-nine stations of the Nakasendō. It is located in the present-day city of Annaka, Gunma Prefecture, Japan. Batō Kan'on (馬頭漢音 horsehead gods) lined the way to the post town.

Neighboring Post Towns
Nakasendō
Itahana-shuku - Annaka-shuku - Matsuida-shuku

References

Stations of the Nakasendō
Post stations in Gunma Prefecture